The Mesozoic marine revolution refers to the increase in shell-crushing (durophagous) and boring predation in benthic organisms throughout the Mesozoic era (251 Mya to 66 Mya).  The term was first coined by Geerat J. Vermeij, who based his work on that of Steven M. Stanley. While the MMR was initially restricted to the Cretaceous (145 Mya to 66 Mya), more recent studies have suggested that the beginning of this ecological arms race extends as far back as the Triassic, with the MMR now being considered to have started in the Anisian or the Aalenian. It is an important transition between the Palaeozoic evolutionary fauna and the Modern evolutionary fauna that occurred throughout the Mesozoic.

The Mesozoic marine revolution was not the first bout of increased predation pressure; that occurred around the end of the Ordovician. There is some evidence of adaptation to durophagy during the Palaeozoic, particularly in crinoids.

Causes

The Mesozoic marine revolution was driven by the evolution of shell-crushing behaviour among Mesozoic marine predators, the technique being perfected in the Late Cretaceous. This forced shelled marine invertebrates to develop defences against such predation or be wiped out. The consequences of this can be seen in many invertebrates today. Such predators are thought to include: Triassic placodonts, Triassic ichthyosaurs, Triassic Omphalosaurus, Triassic plesiosaurs, Jurassic pliosaurs, Late Cretaceous mosasaurs and Cretaceous ptychodontoid sharks.

It is thought that the break-up of Pangaea and the formation of new oceans throughout the Mesozoic brought together previously isolated marine communities, forcing them to compete and adapt. The increased shelf space caused by sea-level rise and a hyper-greenhouse climate provided more iterations and chances to evolve, resulting in increasing diversity.

Another proposal is the evolution of hermit crabs. These exploit the shells of dead gastropods, effectively doubling the life-span of the shell. This allows durophagous predators nearly twice the prey, making it a viable niche to exploit.

Effects
The net result of the Mesozoic marine revolution was a change from the sedentary epifaunal lifestyle of the Palaeozoic evolutionary fauna to the infaunal/planktonic mode of life of the modern fauna. Non-mobile types that failed to re-attach to their substrate (such as brachiopods) when removed were picked off as easy prey, whereas those that could hide from predation or be mobile enough to escape had an evolutionary advantage.

Three major trends can be associated with this:
 Reduction in suspension feeding epifauna
 Increasing abundance of infauna
 An intermediate stage of mobile epifauna.

Major casualties of the Mesozoic marine revolution include: sessile crinoids, gastropods, brachiopods and epifaunal bivalves.

Affected taxa

Gastropods
Benthic gastropods were heavily preyed upon throughout the Mesozoic Marine Revolution, the weaker shelled types being pushed out of the benthic zone into more isolated habitats. The Palaeozoic archaeogastropods were subsequently replaced by neritaceans, mesogastropods and neogastropods. The former typically have symmetrical, umbilicate shells that are mechanically weaker than the latter. These lack an umbilicus and also developed the ability to modify the interior of their shells, allowing them to develop sculptures on their exterior to act as defence against predators.

Another development among Muricidae was the ability to bore through shells and consume prey. These marks (while relatively rare) generally occur on sessile invertebrates, implying that they put pressure on Palaeozoic-type faunas during the Mesozoic Marine Revolution.

Crinoids
The Mesozoic Marine Revolution heavily affected the crinoids, making the majority of forms extinct. Their sessile nature made them easy prey for durophagous predators since the Triassic. Survivors (such as the comatulids) could swim or crawl, behaved nocturnally or had autotomy (the ability to shed limbs in defence).

The shift in the range of sessile stalked crinoids during the late Mesozoic from the shallow shelf to habitats further offshore suggests that they were forced by increased predation pressure in shallow water to migrate to a deep water refuge environment where predation pressure was lower and their mode of life more viable. This migration was not globally synchronous and delayed in the Southern Hemisphere; it did not occur until the Late Eocene in Australia and Antarctica, and until the Early Miocene in Zealandia.

Brachiopods
Brachiopods, the dominant benthic organism of the Palaeozoic, suffered badly during the Mesozoic Marine Revolution. Their sessile foot-attached nature made them easy prey to durophagous predators. The fact that they could not re-attach to a substrate if an attack failed meant their chances of survival were slim.  Unlike bivalves, brachiopods never adapted to an infaunal habit (excluding lingulids) and so remained vulnerable throughout the Mesozoic Marine Revolution. As a result of increased predation pressure on top of heightened competition with bivalves, brachiopods became a minor component of most marine faunas by the Cenozoic despite their incredible diversity and abundance during the Palaeozoic and early Mesozoic.

Bivalves
Bivalves adapted more readily than the Brachiopods to this transition. The majority of bivalves adopted an infaunal habit, using their siphons to gather nutrients from the sediment-water interface while remaining safe. Others like Pecten developed the ability to jump a short distance away from predators by contracting their valves.

Like brachiopods, epifaunal varieties of bivalves were preyed upon heavily. Among epifaunal types (such as mussels and oysters), the ability to fuse to the substrate made them more difficult to consume for smaller predators. Epifaunal bivalves were preyed on heavily pre-Norian but extinction rates diminish after this.

Echinoids
Echinoids do not suffer major predation (save for general infaunalisation) during the Mesozoic Marine Revolution but it is clear from bromalites (fossilised ‘vomit’) that cidaroids were consumed by predators. Echinoids radiate into predatory niches and are thought to have perfected coral grazing in the Late Cretaceous.
Cidaroids too may have contributed to the downfall of the crinoids.

See also
 Cretaceous crab revolution
 Carboniferous-Earliest Permian Biodiversification Event

References

Mesozoic events